Stairway Peak is a  mountain summit located on the Continental Divide, on the shared border of Alberta and British Columbia in the Canadian Rockies. It is also on the shared border between Banff National Park and Yoho National Park, and can be seen from the Icefields Parkway. It was named in 1918 by Arthur O. Wheeler.

Geology
Stairway Peak is composed of sedimentary rock laid down during the Precambrian to Jurassic periods. Formed in shallow seas, this sedimentary rock was pushed east and over the top of younger rock during the Laramide orogeny.

Climate
Based on the Köppen climate classification, Stairway Peak is located in a subarctic climate zone with cold, snowy winters, and mild summers. Temperatures can drop below −20 °C with wind chill factors below −30 °C. Precipitation runoff from the peak drains east to the Mistaya River, or west into tributaries of the Blaeberry River.

See also
 List of peaks on the British Columbia–Alberta border

References

Two-thousanders of Alberta
Two-thousanders of British Columbia
Mountains of Banff National Park
Canadian Rockies